McCrae Homestead is an historic property located in McCrae, Victoria, Australia. It was built at the foot of Arthurs Seat, a small mountain, near the shores of Port Phillip in 1844 by Andrew McCrae, a lawyer, and his wife Georgiana Huntly McCrae, a portrait artist of note. The homestead is under the care of the National Trust of Australia, and is open to the public. Volunteers who are knowledgeable about the history of the house conduct tours and answer questions.

One of Victoria's oldest homesteads, it illustrates how early pioneers used whatever they found locally to build houses and farms using primitive construction techniques. The walls of the house are made of horizontal drop slab cut from local timbers including stringybark from the top of the mountain. Tuck, who was employed by the McCraes and assisted by the older boys of the family, used wattle and daub, bark, messmate shingles and sods as well as slabs and squared logs.

Georgiana designed the house and each detail such as the Count Rumford fireplace. The three thousand bricks necessary to build it were sent down the Bay from Williamstown to Arthurs Seat on the Jemima, a small sailing boat. The house is small but well thought out with a separate kitchen as was common at that time to prevent fires. A floorplan drawn up by Georgiana in 1850 exactly reflects the present layout of the homestead with a small addition being done on the side of the house in the 20th century.

Provenance and restoration 
Following the departure of the McCraes, who resided at the homestead from 1844 to 1851, the interior structure of the house remained unchanged during the Burrell's seventy four year habitation, apart from the addition of two bay windows. They resided at the homestead from 1851 to 1925. John Twycross, a Burrell descendant, who had stayed at the house often as a child was able to point out the previous functions of each room, seventy five years later, such as where his bed had stood in the present child's bedroom, where his aunt Kate had roasted scallops in the open fireplace of the kitchen, as well as the location in the dining room of the Broadwood piano that had been dropped into the sea during transportation to "The Seat" and had thereafter been difficult to tune.

Kate Burrell died in 1925 and the Williams family purchased the house in 1927. There was an auction under the name of "The Lighthouse Estate" and the remaining property was subdivided into blocks of land. The Williams carried out some renovations, (possibly covering the original walls) and converted the outside kitchen into a small flat. From 1938 to 1947 the homestead was used as a private nursing home until it was sold in 1952. From 1952 until 1955, the house was divided into two flats to be let as holiday accommodation, a new development on the peninsula following the second world war.

In 1961 the house was repurchased in a visionary act by George Gordon McCrae, who was named after his grandfather and was thus Georgiana's great grandson. Following his death his son, Andrew, donated it to the National Trust of Victoria in 1970. By then, the exterior surroundings of the house were greatly changed by time and the original vast land run purchased by Andrew McCrae had shrunk to a mere few blocks. The interior of the house was dilapidated. But amazingly, there the homestead still sat, now the oldest wooden structure to survive the ravages of time in Victoria. It still waited, hopefully facing the Bay, but with its view mostly obscured.

In the 20th century the Burrells had covered the original wooden messmate shingles with a corrugated roof both for tank water and to protect against bushfires. When the homestead was restored by the National Trust, the shingles were revealed under the newer cladding roof, which had protected the integrity of the original messmate shingles that had remained in position since 1844.

Connection to Heronswood
All early buildings in the area incorporated local materials. Heronswood, a grand home which stands above Anthonys Nose, is today open to the public. The main building was built in 1874, of a rare green granite that was obtained from the original McCrae property in 1874. The shingle roofs of the McCrae homestead and the first building at Heronswood were made of local messmate timber.

McCrae family 
The McCraes were early settlers to the new colony of Victoria, Australia. Andrew arrived from England in 1839, and Georgiana also emigrated to Australia following her husband in 1841 with their four young sons.
As did Georgiana, her eldest son, George Gordon McCrae (1833–1927) recorded many of his experiences at Arthur's Seat both in diary form and as sketches and paintings. They were one of the first families to settle on the Mornington Peninsula and they built their new home near the future location of McCrae Lighthouse, overlooking Port Phillip. The McCraes also knew Arthur's Seat as Wango, the name given this large granite outcrop, by the Bunurong.

In 1934, one of Georgiana's grandsons, the poet Hugh McCrae, published her journals, under the title "Georgiana's Journal." The journal chronicled her pre– departure from England in 1838 on the Argyle in 1840 to the year 1865, including the years at Arthur's Seat from 1844 to 1851. Letters included in the diary that she received from Arthur's Seat from her children, George Gordon, Willie, Sandy, and Perry who were sent on ahead of their parents from Melbourne, with their tutor John McClure, express their excitement as they helped build huts, fished from the beach below the homestead and explored what was then a pristine environment teeming with bush creatures. They also befriended the Bunurong, the indigenous people of the Port Phillip area who taught them their language and songs. The four boys learned how to fish with wooden spears. In 1847, George wrote a detailed description of a Corroboree. John McClure was born on the Isle of Skye and had received an education in the classics and therefore the McCrae's sons received a fine education in conjunction with living a pioneer lifestyle. The Schoolhouse, one of the original huts on the property, was nicknamed "The University of Arthur's Seat", also referred to later by this same title by the Burrell family children. In the 1920s John Twycross made a pictorial photograph of the hut which at this stage was leaning somewhat.

A watercolour painting was done in the late 1850s by Edward La Trobe Bateman entitled "Mr McClure's Hut."
On 19 July 1846 Georgiana wrote one of many entries in her diary , this describing the homestead.

Construction of the homestead 
"It is more than a year since we squatted, or as the aborigines say, Quambied (camped) on Arthur's Seat - the antipodes of that ilk.	
Our house is built of gum-tree slabs supported, horizontally, by grooved corner-posts, and the same artifice (used again) for windows and doors. The biggest room has been furnished with a table and chairs, but no pictures - long lines of actual landscape appearing in interstices between the planks, instead! In addition to the house proper, we have recently erected  a suite of wattle and daub rooms, which only need plastering"	
The interior rooms of the homestead that were completed soon after this reflect Georgiana's artistry and good taste in design and furnishings. It is furnished with original artefacts and furniture handed down by Georgiana McCrae to her descendants.

The view 
"......Situated on a terrace of sandy soil, about two hundred yards up from the beach, we command a view of Shortlands Bluff lighthouse , the two points...Nepean and Lonsdale...and, in clear weather, Cape Otway, faintly sustained in the west."   	
This magnificent view has now been obscured by development although it can still be viewed from Seawinds, at Arthurs Seat State Park further up the mountain above the homestead.

The life of a pioneer woman 
"July 22nd, 1845	
Dead calm. The bay like a mirror. Lanty and Neale went out to fish. Tuck fastened the two halves of our door to the hinges, thus excluding the dogs and geese; also Master Tommy.  Obliged to give up my last packet of sperm candles, otherwise the school-hut will have to close on account of darkness."			
23 July 1845	
"Since the flour sacks are full of holes, I have removed my dresses from the tinned chest and filled it with flour instead." 		 
	
23 January 1850	
"While the boys were away at the beach, I heard somebody shout excitedly, five or six times, and, on going out of the house, I noticed Mr McLure ahead of me, running towards the saw-pit. I followed as fast as I could and was astonished to see our dray, tipped up, with the two shafter-bullocks hanging by the bows from the pole which had become caught in a native "cherry".

Her family 
"Arthurs's Seat, June 6th, 1849.  Mr Courtney measured our heights on the wall of the dining- room, as follows: 
	
Fanny-Two years old, less 14 days, 2 feet 8 inches		 
	
Poppety-Five years, less 19 days, 3 feet 4 inches.
 
Lucia- Seven years and a half, 4 feet
		 	
Perry- Ten years,seven months, 4 feet 3 3/4 inches   		 
	
Willie-Fourteen and a half, 4 feet 7 inches
			
Sandy-Twelve and a half, 4 feet, 11 1/2 inches
		 	
George -Sixteen years, 5 feet 2 1/2 inches
 		 	
I, myself, me-5 feet 3 1/2 inches
 			
Mr. McLure- 5 feet 7 inches
 		 	
Mr. Courtney, and Mr. McCrae- 5 feet 10 inches"

On leaving "The Seat" 

"Arthur's Seat, October 6th, 1851.
 	
Yet a deeper sorrow has now arrived when I must say good-bye to my mountain home, the house I have built, the garden I have formed.".

Burrell family 

In 1851 the Burrell family arrived in Melbourne from Bury St Edmunds in England and soon purchased Arthur's Seat Run from the McCrae family where they lived and farmed cattle and sheep until 1925, when Kate Burrell, the last of their children died. Evidence of their occupation is seen within the homestead in the newspapers lining one of the bedroom walls that were published in Bury St Edmunds. Being so close to the Bay, the drop slab house was drafty in the winter. George Gordon McCrae, who had spent idyllic childhood days at the homestead, continued to visit the Burrells, as evidenced in several letters and photographs. The Burrells were not able to keep the homestead and it then passed out of the family.

Both Georgiana's family and members of the Burrell family were deeply attached to Arthur's Seat Run as it was then called and maintain strong ties to the homestead. Ownership by the National Trust of Australia has preserved the homestead and its stories as part of Victoria's history.

McCrae Homestead Visitors Centre
This is a gallery that was built adjacent to the original homestead to house the McCrae and Burrell family collections of 19th century heirlooms Following a guided tour of the house, these galleries help the viewer to understand more of the history of the homestead and society in general at that time.

McCrae Gallery
The McCrae Gallery is a recently restored space that uses original fine sketches and drawings by Georgiana McCrae, costumes and artefacts to illustrate Georgiana's extraordinary life. The exhibit shows the transitions that she made from her birth as the illegitimate daughter of a Scottish Lord from Clan Gordon, to her studies of portrait painting in London as a young woman, her marriage to Andrew McCrae and their emigration to Melbourne, her life there as part of Melbourne society, and her love of her "mountain home" where she lived the life of a pioneer while maintaining her life as a painter.

She kept a diary that shrewdly analysed Victorian society. Many of her lively letters are held in the Latrobe Library archives, part of the State Library of Victoria Of interest is her paint box and brushes and a Scottish kilt of Gordon tartan, that was made in a child's size for one of her sons. Also there are some examples of her exquisite miniatures, including a self-portrait, and paintings of her children and of Eliza, a member of the Bunurong tribe. There is also a childhood drawing by George Gordon McCrae finely illustrating a local corroboree.

Burrell Twycross Gallery
The Burrell Twycross Gallery tells the story of the Burrell family who lived at the Arthurs Seat cottage for seventy four years. The Gallery contains video presentations, original artefacts and furnishings.

A rare surviving example of a large format Ambrotype portrait of the Burrells is featured, that was taken in 1857, six years after they settled at Arthur's Seat. It shows the 8 family members that were still living at the homestead after the early years of births, deaths and re migration to England. Following the death of her first husband Samuel Henry Clutterbuck, Charlotte Burrell married John Twycross, a wool merchant from Wokingham, England, at the homestead in 1870.

The Visions of Port Phillip exhibition displays the photographic works of their son, early-20th century pictorialist John William Twycross. He was a banker who spent his holidays visiting his mother's family at Arthur's Seat Run before development changed the area forever. His work combines artistry and environmentalism. In addition the large fine art prints are of great historic interest, capturing long ago days on the peninsula. The works clearly show the strong ties that were formed between families that were early pioneers on Mornington Peninsula and their dependence on the bay for transport, fishing, and pleasure.

The Victorian Community History Awards are granted annually and presented to recognise "the importance of local and community history as a form of collective memory", and to recognise excellence in historical research. in 2010 the Best Audio-Visual / Multimedia award was given to Keith White & Will Twycross for Visions of Port Phillip: The Burrells of Arthur's Seat 1851–1925

The judges found that "A rich and extensive family photographic album forms the extraordinary raw material for a 14-chapter social documentary which also draws on family stories to profile the development of one of Melbourne’s historic and popular beachside holiday regions." Images are drawn from the pictorial black and white photographs of John William Twycross and colour slides taken in the 1950s by his son John Twycross on the Mornington peninsula.

Information for the DVD was gathered from family papers, oral histories, The Dromana and District Historical Society Inc, and the LaTrobe Library archives. Chapter 2, "Once Were Wetlands" drew on 19th century books and maps owned by the Twycross family and an article from the Victorian Historical Journal of 1940 that featured the natural history of the Arthur's Seat area as recalled by George Gordon McCrae in the latter part of his life.

John William Twycross was also part of an extraordinary group of first cousins, William Scoresby Routledge, anthropologist, Easter Island, John Milne inventor of the modern seismograph, and his sister Lilian Twycross, Melbourne opera singer and the first student of F. Matthias Alexander.

Of further interest are original papers and quotes from Alfred William Howitt who was a family friend show his perspective on the Bay and the beauty of the land and sea at "The Seat". "The Bay is covered with a haze as I look out... the smell of new hay comes in at the windows...a few hundred yards below the house is a belt of huge honeysuckle wattles, tea tree and she oaks edging the beach... over the tops you see the bay as smooth as a pond and six miles off are the heads and a blue broken ridge of hills."

Notes

External links 
  Australian Newspapers: Articles from Cindy Hann on the Burrells (1848–1925)
 Virtual Sorrento, contact information, opening hours, photographs, directions to McCrae Homestead
 McCrae, George Gordon,1833–1927 Album of 406 drawings (1839–1903):pen, ink and watercolour: National Library of Australia
 Harry Burrell of Arthurs Seat Run accompanies the search party led by Howitt for Burke and Wills
 Burke and Wills: The Victorian Exploring Party, 1862

Heritage-listed buildings in Melbourne
National Trust of Australia
Historic house museums in Victoria (Australia)
Homesteads in Victoria
Buildings and structures in the Shire of Mornington Peninsula
1844 establishments in Australia
Houses completed in 1844